"Kiss the Dirt (Falling Down the Mountain)" is a song by the Australian rock band INXS. It was written by Andrew Farriss and Michael Hutchence from the 1985 album Listen Like Thieves.

It was released as the album's third single in March 1986 and reached #15 on the Australian singles chart, becoming the band's tenth Top 20 hit in their country. It was, however, the band's seventh single that failed to chart in the United States, but it did manage to reach #24 on the Mainstream Rock Tracks chart.

In 2002, "Kiss the Dirt (Falling Down the Mountain)" was included on the soundtrack of the popular and critically acclaimed Rockstar video game Grand Theft Auto: Vice City on its in-game radio station "Flash FM".

The music video shows the band performing on a salt lake and on the moon plains in Coober Pedy in South Australia.  The band flew direct from the United States to the site and filmed the clip overnight then flew back to the United States. In the bridge, the band is shown performing while fire and gloom cover the area, before the skies clear up at the end.

It was directed by Alex Proyas.

Charts

References

1986 singles
INXS songs
Songs written by Andrew Farriss
Songs written by Michael Hutchence
Song recordings produced by Chris Thomas (record producer)